The Hudsonian godwit (Limosa haemastica) is a large shorebird in the sandpiper family, Scolopacidae. The genus name Limosa is from Latin and means "muddy", from limus, "mud". The specific haemastica is from Ancient Greek and means "bloody". An 18th-century name for this bird was red-breasted godwit. The English term "godwit" was first recorded in about 1416–7 and is believed to imitate the bird's call.

Description
Adults have long dark legs and a long pink bill with a slight upward curve and dark at the tip. The upper parts are mottled brown and the underparts are chestnut. The tail is black and the rump is white. They show black wing linings in flight. The legs and feet are bluish-grey.

Breeding
Their breeding habitat is the far north near the tree line in northwestern Canada and Alaska, also on the shores of Hudson Bay. They nest on the ground, in a well-concealed location in a marshy area. The female usually lays 4 olive-buff eggs marked with darker splotches. Incubation period is 22 days. Both parents look after the young birds, who find their own food and are able to fly within a month of hatching.

Migration
They migrate to South America and the Caribbean. These birds gather at James Bay before fall migration. In good weather, many birds make the trip south without stopping. They are vagrants to Europe, Australia, and South Africa.

They can perhaps be most easily seen in migration on the east coast of North America where they can be plentiful in migration in late July through early August.

Diet
These birds forage by probing in shallow water. They mainly eat insects and crustaceans.

Conservation history
Their numbers were reduced by hunting at the end of the 19th century.

References

External links

 Hudsonian godwit - Limosa haemastica - USGS Patuxent Bird Identification InfoCenter
 Hudsonian godwit Species Account - Cornell Lab of Ornithology
 
 
 
 

Hudsonian godwit
Native birds of Alaska
Birds of Canada
Birds of the Dominican Republic
Birds of the Caribbean
Birds of South America
Hudsonian godwit
Hudsonian godwit